Charles Matton, also known as Gabriel Pasqualini, (13 September 1931 – 19 November 2008) was a multitalented French artist: painter, sculptor, illustrator, writer, photographer, screenwriter and a movie director.

Illustrations 
In the 1970s, Matton worked with Jean-Paul Goude at Esquire, working as an illustrator and a photographer.

The Boxes 
In 1983, Matton was able to show his art in Paris, and in 1987, he exhibited at the Palais de Tokyo. There, he showed what would become his famous Boxes.
Then, in 1989, he exhibited at the Museum of Modern Art of Paris, the Centre Georges Pompidou.

During the last decade of his life, Matton showed his work all around the world, especially in New York and Los Angeles, through the Forum Gallery.

After his death, his wife, Sylvie Matton, kept promoting his work and exhibitions took place in Germany and England.

Films 
 1999 : Rembrandt
 1994 : The Light of the Dead Stars 
 1988 : Douanes (documentary)
 1976 : Spermula
 1972 : L’Italien des roses
 1968 : Mai 68 ou les violences policières (short)
 1967 : La Pomme ou l’histoire d’une histoire (short)

References

External links 

 
 
 Boxes at the All Visual Arts Gallery, London
 Boxes at the Michael Haas Gallery, Berlin
 Photographic works at the Steven Bulger Gallery, Toronto
 Boxes on Pinterest
 Works on Tumblr

French painters
Modern painters
Film directors from Paris
1931 births
2008 deaths
Artists from Paris